Thomas William Parsons (born 2 May 1987) is an Australian born English former professional cricketer. He played seven first-class cricket matches between 2007 and 2011 as a right-arm fast-medium pace bowler.

Parsons was born at Melbourne in Australia and educated at Maidstone Grammar School and Loughborough University. An academy player with Kent County Cricket Club, he played for the county Second XI from 2005 and made his first-class debut in 2007 for Loughborough University Centre of Cricketing Excellence against Worcestershire. Later in the season Parsons played a First XI match for Kent, playing in a rain-effected limited overs match against Sri Lanka A in July.

Parsons played first-class matches for Loughborough and signed a contract with Hampshire after graduating in 2008.  He played for the county First XI and was released at the end of the 2009 season. He played Australian Grade Cricket and minor counties cricket for Berkshire in 2010 and 2011 before making a first-class appearance for Middlesex against the touring Sri Lankans in 2011 after signing a contract with the county.

After he was released by Middlesex at the end of the 2011 season, Parsons took a job in a company run by teammate Jono McLean as social media manager. After the company failed he and McLean established their own company, Wildfire, which promotes brands across the world. The company became part of the 21six group of companies.

Parsons has played club cricket in the Kent Cricket League for The Mote and Sevenoaks Vine, captaining Sevenoaks to the league title in 2014. He moved to play cricket at Leeds in 2019.

References

External links

1987 births
Living people
English cricketers
Kent cricketers
Hampshire cricketers
Loughborough MCCU cricketers
People educated at Maidstone Grammar School
Alumni of Loughborough University
Berkshire cricketers
Middlesex cricketers
Cricketers from Melbourne
English cricketers of the 21st century